Nakkim is a surname. Notable people with the surname include:

Are Nakkim (born 1964), Norwegian long-distance runner
Kjellaug Nakkim (1940–2022), Norwegian politician
Kyrre Nakkim (born 1966), Norwegian journalist
Markus Nakkim (born 1996), Norwegian footballer 

Norwegian-language surnames